Ettore Marchi (born 6 November 1985) is an Italian professional footballer who plays as a striker for an amateur side Branca.

Club career
Born in Gubbio, Umbria, Marchi started his career at A.S. Gubbio 1910. In January 2007 he was signed by Serie B side Triestina and loaned back to Gubbio. He then spent 3 more seasons in Italian Lega Pro leagues with 3 difference clubs. After the club relegated to Lega Pro Prima Divisione and re-admitted to Serie B, Marchi finally became a member of the first team, and played every league match before the winter break and played 36 games, including 33 starts. The coach rotated his goalscoring partner instead, between Denis Godeas, Lucas Longoni, Massimiliano Lionetti and Luigi Della Rocca (or even 4-5-1 formation). The team finished as the 20th and relegated.

On 3 August 2011 he joined Serie B team Sassuolo in 2-year deal, for €130,000 transfer fee. On 27 June 2012, Marchi was sold to the third division club Benevento for €150,000 also in 2-year contract. On 12 August 2013, Marchi left for fellow third division club Pro Vercelli, which had recently been relegated, while Matteo Di Piazza joined Benevento from Vercelli in exchange.

On 7 January 2019, Marchi signed for Serie C club Monza until 30 June 2020. He was sent on a six-month loan to Juventus U23 on 21 January 2020. On 12 August 2020 Marchi joined Vis Pesaro on a two-year contract. On 23 July 2021, he was transferred to Fermana, with Marco Manetta moving in the opposite direction in exchange.

Honours

Club 
PortoSummaga
 Lega Pro Prima Divisione: 2010

Juventus U23
 Coppa Italia Serie C: 2019–20

References

External links
 

1985 births
Living people
People from Gubbio
Footballers from Umbria
Italian footballers
Association football forwards
Serie B players
Serie C players
A.S. Gubbio 1910 players
U.S. Triestina Calcio 1918 players
A.S.D. Sangiovannese 1927 players
A.C. Bellaria Igea Marina players
A.S.D. Portogruaro players
U.S. Sassuolo Calcio players
Benevento Calcio players
F.C. Pro Vercelli 1892 players
A.C. Reggiana 1919 players
A.C. Monza players
Juventus Next Gen players
Vis Pesaro dal 1898 players
Fermana F.C. players
Sportspeople from the Province of Perugia